Mohd Shakir bin Shaari (born 29 September 1986) is a Malaysian professional football player and manager.

He last plays as a defensive midfielder for Johor Darul Ta'zim II in Malaysia Premier League. He has an ability of long-range shots with power towards the goal post. His high work rate, timing of his tackles and stamina makes him one of the best Malaysian defensive midfielders.

Early life
Shakir was born in Kota Bharu, Kelantan. He is the eighth child of eleven siblings. His interest in football existed only when he plays on the field around the village when he was a kid. In 1998, he was chosen to represent Kelantan at MSSM Championship Football Under 12 Years. Shakir journey of life continues to shine when selected into the Sekolah Sukan Tengku Mahkota Ismail (SSTMI) (formerly known as Sekolah Sukan Bandar Penawar), Kota Tinggi. Throughout those schools, Shakir has also represented Malaysia Sports School (combined schools sports) at the Nike Cup Under 15 Years in Bangkok in 2001 before continuing his studies from in Bukit Jalil Sports School (SSBJ) a year later.

Club career
Shakir started his career with Kelantan President Cup Team in 2004 at the age of 18. In 2005, he joins MPPJ FC for a season and then left the club cause of the financial problems.
After that, he signs a contract with MyTeam which competed in the Malaysia Super League in 2006. In 2009, the club was withdraw from Malaysia Super League cause of the financial problems.
After seeing his potential to be a great midfielder, Kelantan's coach Peter James Butler brought him into the team. He was officially joins Kelantan in 2010.
He also was the part of the Kelantan's 2010 Malaysia Cup winning team, 2011 Malaysia Super League champions, and 2012 Malaysia FA Cup winner.

MPPJ FC
In 2006, Shakir's career continued, playing for the first time in the Malaysia Super League with MPPJ FC, a club based in Selangor.

UPB MyTeam
In 2007, he played for MyTeam for three seasons until the club disbanded late 2009.

Kelantan
He return to his hometown and playing for Kelantan in 2010.
He helped Kelantan win three cups in 2012. Malaysian FA Cup, Malaysia Super League and Malaysia Cup.

International career
Shakir made his international debut against Myanmar on 18 June 2011 and helped his team win by 2–0. He also was called up by Malaysia coach, Datuk K. Rajagobal for friendly matches against Philippines and Singapore in June 2012. Shakir was called up for the 2012 AFF Suzuki Cup.

Career statistics

Club

International

Personal life
On 9 December 2010, Shakir had married with Nurul Fatiha Abd Hamid, former national artistic gymnastics athletes who working as television presenter for RTM. They have a son after two years of their marriage.

Honours

Kelantan
 Malaysia Super League: 2011, 2012; Runner-up 2010
 Malaysia Cup: 2010, 2012; Runner-up 2013
 Malaysia FA Cup: 2012; Runner-up 2011
 Malaysia Charity Shield: 2011; Runner-up 2012

Johor Darul Takzim
 Malaysia Super League: 2014, 2015, 2016, 2017
 Malaysia Cup Runner-up: 2014, Champion: 2017
 Malaysia FA Cup: 2016
 Malaysian Charity Shield: 2015, 2016
 AFC Cup: 2015

References

External links
 Shakir Shaari at SoccerPunter.com
 
 

1986 births
Living people
Malaysian footballers
Malaysia international footballers
UPB-MyTeam FC players
MPPJ FC players
Kelantan FA players
Johor Darul Ta'zim F.C. players
People from Kota Bharu
People from Kelantan
Malaysia Super League players
Association football midfielders
AFC Cup winning players